WS1 can refer to:

 Waardenburg syndrome, a genetic disorder
 Crown of Slaves, the 1st book in David Weber's Wages of Sin series. 
 WS-1, (Weishi Rockets-1) a 302mm self-propelled multiple rocket launcher
 FA WSL 1, the top tier of the FA Women's Super League in English football
 WS1, a candidate phylum of bacteria